Oswaldo Loureiro (23 July 1932 – 3 February 2018) was a Brazilian film and television actor. Loureiro began his career as a child actor in the 1940s before moving on to adult roles.

Loureiro was born in Rio de Janeiro. He died in São Paulo on 3 February 2018 at the age of 85.

Partial filmography

 É Proibido Sonhar (1944)
 Romance Proibido (1944)
 O Brasileiro João de Souza (1944) - Young Mário
 Asas do Brasil (1947)
 Minas Conspiracy (1948)
 Um Caso de Polícia (1959)
 O 5º Poder (1962) - Carlos
 Sonhando com Milhões (1963) - Guimarães
 The Beggars (1963)
 Manaus, Glória de Uma Época (1963) - Green Napoleon
 Um Morto ao Telefone (1964) - Marcelo
 A Morte em Três Tempos (1964)
 Engraçadinha Depois dos Trinta (1966) - Luís Cláudio
 Uma Rosa para Todos (1967) - Nino
 Mineirinho Vivo ou Morto (1967) - Dr. Geraldo
 O Homem Nu (1968) - Ludovico
 Máscara da Traição (1969)
 Os Herdeiros (1970) - Barros
 As Confissões de Frei Abóbora (1971)
 Um Brasileiro Chamado Rosaflor (1976)
 O Sol dos Amantes (1979)
 Bonitinha, mas Ordinária (1981)
 Beijo no Asfalto (1981) - Cunha
 Bar Esperança (1983) - Baby
 Parahyba Mulher Macho (1983)
 Atrapalhando a Suate (1983)
 Para Viver um Grande Amor (1984)
 Sexo Frágil (1986)
 Rádio Pirata (1987) - Werner
 Leila Diniz (1987) - Alfredo Buzaid
 Sonho de Verão (1990) - Oswaldo
 O Fim do Mundo (1996, TV Series) - Romildo Galvão
 Simão, o Fantasma Trapalhão (1998) - Hiram

References

Bibliography 
 Marsh, Leslie. Brazilian Women's Filmmaking: From Dictatorship to Democracy. University of Illinois Press, 2012.

External links 
 

1932 births
2018 deaths
Brazilian male television actors
Brazilian male film actors
Male actors from Rio de Janeiro (city)